A corroboree is a generic word for a meeting of Australian Aboriginal peoples. It may be a sacred ceremony, a festive celebration, or of a warlike character. A word coined by the first British settlers in the Sydney area from a word in the local Dharug language, it usually includes dance, music, costume and often body decoration.

Origin and etymology
The word "corroboree" was adopted by British settlers soon after colonisation from the Dharug ("Sydney language") Aboriginal Australian word garaabara, denoting a style of dancing. It thus entered the Australian English language as a loan word.

It is a borrowed English word that has been reborrowed to explain a practice that is different from ceremony and more widely inclusive than theatre or opera.

Description

In 1837, explorer and Queensland grazier Tom Petrie wrote: "Their bodies painted in different ways, and they wore various adornments, which were not used every day." In 1938, clergyman and anthropologist Adolphus Elkin wrote of a public pan-Aboriginal dancing "tradition of individual gifts, skill, and ownership" as distinct from the customary practices of appropriate elders guiding initiation and other ritual practices (ceremonies).

The word is described in the Macquarie Atlas of Indigenous Australia: Second Edition as "an Indigenous assembly of a festive, sacred or warlike character".

Throughout Australia the word "corroboree" embraces songs, dances, rallies and meetings of various kinds. In the past a corroboree has been inclusive of sporting events and other forms of skill display.

Another description is "a gathering of Aboriginal Australians interacting with the Dreaming through song and dance", which may be a sacred ceremony or ritual, or different types of meetings or celebrations, which differ "from mob to mob".

Associated later meanings
The Macquarie Dictionary (3rd ed, 1997) gives secondary meanings "any large or noisy gathering" and "a disturbance; an uproar". It also documents its use as a verb (to take part in a corroboree).

The Macquarie Atlas documents a 2003 sports carnival in the Northern Territory which was described by the president of the Yuendumu community council as "a modern day corroboree".

See also
Corroboree 2000, a reconciliation event in Sydney
Corroboree, a poem by Max Fatchen
Luau
Pow wow
Wangga - traditional music and ceremony of north-western Australia

References

External links

 www.indigenousaustralia.info - The Travel Around Company
 National Museum of Australia: Video recordings, ephemera, costumes and props for the 1954 production of Corroboree
 Corroboree Sydney

Australian Aboriginal words and phrases
Dances of Australia